Lok Lo Ha is a village and valley northeast of Wo Liu Hang in Fo Tan, Sha Tin District, Hong Kong.

Administration
Lok Lo Ha is a recognized village under the New Territories Small House Policy.

History
Lok Lo Ha was historically a sea-shore village. A stone pier for the sampan ferry to Yuen Chau Kok was built at Lok Lo Ha in 1917.

See also
 Ho Tung Lau
 Kau Yeuk (Sha Tin)

References

External links

 Delineation of area of existing village Lok Lo Ha (Sha Tin) for election of resident representative (2019 to 2022)
 Historical photographs of Lok Lo Ha: 1920s, 1964

Villages in Sha Tin District, Hong Kong
Valleys of Hong Kong
Fo Tan